Pokeberry Creek is a  long 3rd order tributary to the Haw River in Chatham County, North Carolina.  This creek is one of two streams in the United States named Pokeberry Creek.  The other is in Warrick County, Indiana.

Course
Pokeberry Creek rises about 5 miles southwest of Chapel Hill, North Carolina in Chatham County and then flows southwest to the Haw River just downstream of Bynum.

Watershed
Pokeberry Creek drains  of area, receives about 47.4 in/year of precipitation, and has a wetness index of 395.85 and is about 71% forested.

See also
List of rivers of North Carolina

References

Additional images

External links
Photo of Pokeberry Creek
Lower Haw River Trail

Rivers of North Carolina
Rivers of Chatham County, North Carolina